In computer graphics, a sprite is a two-dimensional bitmap that is integrated into a larger scene, most often in a 2D video game. Originally, the term sprite referred to fixed-sized objects composited together, by hardware, with a background. Use of the term has since become more general.

Systems with hardware sprites include arcade video games of the 1970s and 1980s; game consoles such as the Atari VCS (1977), ColecoVision (1982), Nintendo Entertainment System (1983), and Sega Genesis (1988); and home computers such as the TI-99/4A (1979), Atari 8-bit family (1979), Commodore 64 (1982), MSX (1983), Amiga (1985), and X68000 (1987). Hardware varies in the number of sprites supported, the size and colors of each sprite, and special effects such as scaling or reporting pixel-precise overlap.

Hardware composition of sprites occurs as each scan line is prepared for the video output device, such as a CRT, without involvement of the main CPU and without the need for a full-screen frame buffer. Sprites can be positioned or altered by setting attributes used during the hardware composition process. The number of sprites which can be displayed per scan line is often lower than the total number of sprites a system supports. For example, the Texas Instruments TMS9918 chip supports 32 sprites, but only 4 can appear on the same scan line.

The CPUs in modern computers, video game consoles, and mobile devices are fast enough that bitmaps can be drawn into a frame buffer without special hardware assistance. Beyond that, GPUs can render vast numbers of scaled, rotated, antialiased, partially translucent, very high resolution images in parallel with the CPU.

Etymology 
According to Karl Guttag, one of two engineers for the 1979 Texas Instruments TMS9918 video display processor, the term sprite came from David Ackley, a manager at TI. It was also used by Danny Hillis at Texas Instruments in the late 1970s. The term was derived from the fact that sprites, rather than being part of the background data in the screen image table, instead "floated" on top without affecting the data in the framebuffer below, much like a ghost or mythological sprite.

Some hardware manufacturers used different terms, especially before sprite became common.

Player/Missile Graphics was a term used by Atari, Inc. for hardware sprites in the Atari 8-bit computers (1979) and Atari 5200 console (1982). The term reflects the use for both characters ("players") and smaller associated objects ("missiles") that share the same color. The earlier Atari Video Computer System and some Atari arcade games used player, missile, and ball.

Stamp was used in some arcade hardware in the early 1980s, including Ms. Pac-Man.

Movable Object Block, or MOB, was used in MOS Technology's graphics chip literature. Commodore, the main user of MOS chips and the owner of MOS for most of the chip maker's lifetime, used the term sprite for the 1982 Commodore 64.

OBJs (short for objects) is used in the developer manuals for the NES, Super NES, and Game Boy. The region of RAM used to store sprite attributes and coordinates is OAM (Object Attribute Memory). This also applies to the Game Boy Advance and Nintendo DS.

History

Arcade video games
The use of sprites originated with arcade video games. Nolan Bushnell came up with the original concept when he developed the first arcade video game, Computer Space (1971). Technical limitations made it difficult to adapt the early mainframe game Spacewar! (1962), which performed an entire screen refresh for every little movement, so he came up with a solution to the problem: controlling each individual game element with a dedicated transistor. The rockets were essentially hardwired bitmaps that moved around the screen independently of the background, an important innovation for producing screen images more efficiently and providing the basis for sprite graphics.

The earliest video games to represent player characters as human player sprites were arcade sports video games, dating back to Taito's TV Basketball, released in April 1974 and licensed to Midway Manufacturing for release in North America. Designed by Tomohiro Nishikado, he wanted to move beyond simple Pong-style rectangles to character graphics, by rearranging the rectangle shapes into objects that look like basketball players and basketball hoops. Ramtek later released another sports video game in October 1974, Baseball, which similarly displayed human-like characters.

The Namco Galaxian arcade system board, for the 1979 arcade game Galaxian, displays animated, multi-colored sprites over a scrolling background. It became the basis for Nintendo's Radar Scope and Donkey Kong arcade hardware and home consoles such as the Nintendo Entertainment System. According to Steve Golson from General Computer Corporation, the term "stamp" was used instead of "sprite" at the time.

Home systems
Signetics devised the first chips capable of generating sprite graphics (referred to as objects by Signetics) for home systems. The Signetics 2636 video processors were first used in the 1978 1292 Advanced Programmable Video System and later in the 1979 Elektor TV Games Computer.

The Atari VCS, released in 1977, has a hardware sprite implementation where five graphical objects can be moved independently of the game playfield.  The term sprite was not in use at the time. The VCS's sprites are called movable objects in the programming manual, further identified as two players, two missiles, and one ball. These each consist of a single row of pixels that are displayed on a scan line.  To produce a two-dimensional shape, the sprite's single-row bitmap is altered by software from one scan line to the next.

The 1979 Atari 400 and 800 home computers have similar, but more elaborate, circuitry capable of moving eight single-color objects per scan line: four 8-bit wide players and four 2-bit wide missiles. Each is the full height of the display—a long, thin strip. DMA from a table in memory automatically sets the graphics pattern registers for each scan line. Hardware registers control the horizontal position of each player and missile. Vertical motion is achieved by moving the bitmap data within a player or missile's strip. The feature was called player/missile graphics by Atari.

Texas Instruments developed the TMS9918 chip with sprite support for its 1979 TI-99/4 home computer. An updated version is used in the 1981 TI-99/4A.

Systems with hardware sprites
These are base hardware specs and do not include additional programming techniques, such as using raster interrupts to repurpose sprites mid-frame.

See also 
 2.5D

References 

Computer graphics
Video game design
Video game development